Samuel Juno Park (born September 25, 1992), better known as Junoflo, is a Korean-American rapper. He has released three studio albums: Progression (2015), Statues (2019), 222:AM (2020), one extended play: Only Human (2018), and several singles. He was a contestant on the TV series Show Me the Money 5 (2016) Show Me the Money 6 (2017).

Life and career
Junoflo (born Samuel Juno Park) was raised in Los Angeles, California. He attended college at the University of California, San Diego and worked as a photographer at hip-hop concerts in San Diego. 

Junoflo first gained fame through his appearance as a contestant on the South Korean survival reality show, Show Me the Money 5 in 2016. Later that year, he signed to Feel Ghood Music, the hip hop label founded by Korean rapper Tiger JK. In 2017, he appeared on Show Me the Money 6, in which he advanced to the semi-finals.

In March 2018, Junoflo released his first album under Feel Ghood Music, the extended play Only Human. The album includes the single, "Grapevine," featuring Jay Park. In January 2019, he released the full-length album, Statues. That same month, he became the first Korean artist to perform at an NBA halftime show, when he performed at a match between the Los Angeles Clippers and the New Orleans Pelicans.

Junoflo left Feel Ghood Music in April 2019 and relocated back to Los Angeles at the beginning of 2020. He released a 10-track, full-length album, 222:AM in September 2020 with guest features from Ted Park, Jeff Bernat, Manila Grey, Miknna, and others.

Discography

Studio albums

Collaborative albums

Extended plays

Singles

References

External links
 

1992 births
Living people
South Korean male rappers
South Korean hip hop singers
21st-century South Korean male  singers